The Caspian seal (Pusa caspica, syn. Phoca caspica) is one of the smallest members of the earless seal family and unique in that it is found exclusively in the brackish Caspian Sea. It lives along the shorelines, but also on the many rocky islands and floating blocks of ice that dot the Caspian Sea. In winter and cooler parts of the spring and autumn season, it populates the northern Caspian coastline. As the ice melts in the summer and warmer parts of the spring and autumn season, it also occurs in the deltas of the Volga and Ural Rivers, as well as the southern latitudes of the Caspian where the water is cooler due to greater depth.

Evidence suggests the seals are descended from Arctic ringed seals that reached the area from the north during an earlier part of the Quaternary period and became isolated in the landlocked Caspian Sea when continental ice sheets melted.

Description
Males are longer than females at an early age, but females experience more rapid growth until they reach ten years of age. Males can grow gradually until they reach an age of about 30 or 40 years.

The skull structure of the Caspian seal suggests it is closely related to the Baikal seal. In addition, the morphological structures in both species suggest they are descended from the ringed seal which migrated from larger bodies of water around two million years ago.

Caspian seals can be found not only along the shorelines, but also on the many rocky islands and floating blocks of ice that dot the Caspian Sea. As the ice melts in the warmer season, they can be found on the mouths of the Volga and Ural Rivers, as well as the southern latitudes of the Caspian where cooler waters can be found due to greater depth.

In winter, and cooler parts of the spring and autumn season, these marine mammals populate the Northern Caspian. In the first days of April, spring migration to the southern part of the Caspian Sea begins with mature female seals and their pups, during this migration hungry seals eat the fish in the nets. Male mature seals stay in the northern Caspian Sea longer and wait until the moulting is completed.  In summer, seals find empty places in the western part of Apsheron for resting. In the eastern part, the most crowded place used to be the Ogurchinskiy Island, but by 2001, fewer than 10 pups were recorded on Ogurchinsky, some of which were killed by people on the island.

Diet
Caspian seals are primarily piscivorous. They eat a variety of food depending on season and availability. A typical diet for Caspian seals found in the northern Caspian sea consists of crustaceans and various fish species, such as Clupeonella engrauliformis, C. grimmi, C. caspia, Gobiidae, Rutilus caspicus, Atherina boyeri, and Sander lucioperca.

In autumn and winter, Caspian seals prey mostly on sculpins, gobies, and crustaceans while inhabiting shallow waters in the northern part of the sea.  During the summer, in the southern part of the Caspian Sea, they eat herring, roach, carp, sprat, and smelt. When Caspian seals live in estuaries, they eat large amounts of the freshwater species, Sander lucioperca. Other prey include shrimp, crab, and silversides.

Being one of the top predators in the ecosystem, Caspian seals had hazardous chemicals found inside their bodies such as heavy metals, organochlorine compounds, and radionuclides.

Behavior and ecology
Caspian seals are shallow divers, typically diving  for about one minute, although scientists have recorded Caspian seals diving deeper and for longer periods of time. After foraging during a dive, they rest at the surface of the water.

In the summer and winter, during mating season, Caspian seals tend to live in large groups. At other times of the year, these seals are solitary. During the summer, however, they make aggressive snorts or use flipper waving to tell other seals to keep their distance. Little else is known about their behavior.

Reproduction
Male and female Caspian seals are monogamous. Among breeding seals, a lack of fighting for a mate seems prevalent. In late autumn, Caspian seals travel to the northern part of the Caspian Sea where the water is shallow and frozen to give birth in secluded areas on ice sheets after a gestation period of 11 months. Normally, pregnancy rates are  40 to 70%, but are currently at an all-time low of 30%. In late January to early February, female seals give birth to one pup each. Their white coats are molted at around three weeks to a month. Male pups become sexually mature after six to seven years, whereas female pups sexually mature after five to seven years. Newborn pups are not fully grown until 8 to 10 years after they are born. Breeding begins a few weeks after the birth of last year's pup around late February to mid March. Breeding usually occurs after weaning of a newborn pup, but can begin while the pup is still nursing. Caspian seals migrate back to the southern part of the Caspian Sea after the breeding season and molting in late April because the north begins to warm with constant ice melting. The southern region of the Caspian Sea has deep, colder waters where the seals spend the summer months.

Diseases
Several recent cases of large numbers of Caspian seals dying due to canine distemper virus have been reported, in 1997, 2000 and 2001. In April 2000, a mass die-off of Caspian seals was first reported near the mouth of the Ural River in Kazakhstan. It spread south to the Mangistau region, and by the end of May, more than 10,000 seals had died along the Kazakhstan coast. High death rates were also recorded in May and June along the Apsheron peninsula of Azerbaijan and the Turkmenistan coast.

Clinical signs of infected seals included debilitation, muscle spasms, ocular and nasal exudation, and sneezing.  Necropsies performed in June 2000 on eight Azerbaijan seals revealed microscopic lesions, including bronchointerstitial pneumonia, encephalitis, pancreatitis and lymphocytic depletion in lymphoid tissues.  Similar lesions were also discovered on four seals from Kazakhstan. Morbillivirus antigen was also detected in multiple tissues, including lung, lymph nodes, spleen, brain, pancreas, liver, and epithelial tissue of the reproductive, urinary, and gastrointestinal tracts. Such tissue lesions are characteristic of distemper in both terrestrial and aquatic mammals.

Tissues from 12 carcasses found in Kazakhstan, Azerbaijan, and Turkmenistan were examined for morbillivirus nucleic acid. Sequences from the examination showed that canine distemper virus, which is part of the genus Morbillivirus, was the primary cause of death. The sequences also proved that seals from widely separated regions of the Caspian Sea were infected by the same virus. This finding established spatial and temporal links between the seal deaths in these regions. The sequences were also identical to that of canine distemper virus found in the brain tissue of a seal that died in 1997 and showed no morbillivirus lesions. This suggests persistence of canine distemper virus in the Caspian seal population over a span of several years or repeated spillover from the same terrestrial reservoir.

Another study in 2000 using 18 Caspian seal corpses found several concurrent bacterial infections that could have contributed to the illness of the affected seals. These include Bordetella bronchiseptica, Streptococcus phocae, Salmonella dublin, and S. choleraesuis. Corynebacterium caspium, a new bacterium, was identified in one of the seals, and poxvirus, Atopobacter phocae, Eimeria- and Sarcocystis-like organisms, and a Halarachne species were identified in Caspian seals for the first time. The study also asserts that the “unusually mild” winter that preceded the die-off in 2000 could have contributed to its cause “through increased ambient air pressure and accelerated disappearance of ice cover at the breeding areas in the northern Caspian Sea.”

Threats

A century ago, their population was estimated at 1.5 million seals; in 2005, 104,000 remained, with an ongoing decline of 3–4% per year. By 2022, the Caspian Environmental Protection Center estimated the population at 70,000.

In a three-week period in February 1978, wolves were responsible for the killing of numerous seals near Astrakhan. An estimated 17 to 40% of the seals in the area were killed, but not eaten.

Due to increased industrial production in the area, pollution has had an effect on the survival of the Caspian seal. From 1998 to 2000, the concentration of zinc and iron increased dramatically in the tissue of dead, diseased seals. This suggests these elements are causative agents in compromising the Caspian seal's immune system.

Sea eagles are known to hunt these seals, which results in a high number of fatalities for the juveniles. They are also hunted by humans for subsistence and commerce. , commercial icebreaker routes have passed through areas with high Caspian seal pup concentrations, which may contribute to loss of habitat.

For threats related to migration, high density seal aggregations were recorded in November 2009 and 2010 CISS helicopter surveys in Kenderli Bay, but the integrity of seal habitat in Kenderli Bay is currently threatened by an imminent large-scale coastal resort development.  This resort development can be a serious disturbance for seals. The local authorities have been advised about the need to preserve the seal habitats in the bay, but it is not yet clear what steps are planned to achieve this. According to the present study, Kosa Kenderli plays an important role for the seasonal migration of the Caspian seals and is recommended to be a protection area.

In December 2022, a substantial die-off was reported, with initial reports of 700 corpses later revised upwards to 2,500. The cause is unknown.

See also

Tyuleniy Archipelago and Tyuleny Island, both named after the Caspian seals
Ringed Seal, Pusa hispida
Baikal Seal, Pusa sibirica

References

Jukka Palo: Genetic diversity and phylogeography of landlocked seals
OBIS-SEAMAP - Species Profiles

External links

Caspian seal factsheet at pinnipeds.org
"Caspian Seal under threat of extinction", Baztab newspaper. Persian article.

Phocins
Fauna of the Caspian Sea
Seal, Caspian
Seal, Caspian
Seal, Caspian
Seal, Caspian
Endemic fauna of the Caspian Sea
Pinnipeds of Asia
Pinnipeds of Europe
Mammals described in 1788
Taxa named by Johann Friedrich Gmelin